Mouvement pour un Cyclisme Crédible or Movement For Credible Cycling (MPCC) is a union created on July 24, 2007 by seven sponsored teams of professional road cyclists : AG2R Prévoyance, Agritubel, Bouygues Télécom, Cofidis, Crédit Agricole, Française des Jeux and Gerolsteiner. The MPCC was created to defend the idea of a clean cycling, in particular according to the strict code of ethics established by UCI.  The president of the organisation is former cyclist and team manager Roger Legeay who himself tested positive for amphetamines during his career.

March 2015 -  withdraws from MPCC 

July 2015 -  withdraws from MPCC 

Sept 2015 - excluded from the MPCC 

Feb 2016 -  and  withdraws from MPCC,

As of December 2021, the members were:
 18 Continental Teams
 7 Women's Teams
 7 race organisers
 10 federations: UEC, NCF, FFC, Swiss Cycling, CI, KBWB/RLVB, F.R.M.C, ICF
 8 sponsors
Approx 300 individual riders (since May 2018)

References

External links

Cycle racing organizations
Cycle
Cycling organizations in France